NAST may refer to:

 Nepal Academy of Science and Technology
 SAP Nachrichtensteuerung, a messaging concept used by SAP-Systems
 North American Society of Toxinology

See also 
 Nast (disambiguation)